Hinton Admiral railway station is a station serving the villages of Bransgore and Hinton and the town of Highcliffe on the Hampshire/Dorset border in southern England.

The station is on the stretch of line opened in 1888 between Brockenhurst and Christchurch to provide a direct line from London to Bournemouth, bypassing the original "Castleman's Corkscrew" line via Ringwood and reducing that line to a backwater.

There is no village as such named Hinton Admiral. The station was originally named Hinton after the nearby village, but shortly after being opened was renamed Hinton Admiral to share its name with Hinton Admiral House, the residence of Sir George Tapps-Gervis-Meyrick who owned the land on which the station was built.

The station was host to a Southern Railway camping coach from 1938 to 1939. A camping coach was also positioned here by the Southern Region from 1954 to 1960, the coach was replaced from 1961 to 1965 by a Pullman camping coach.

Services 
The station and all passenger train services calling here are operated by South Western Railway. The platforms are able to accommodate trains of up to five coaches (444 and 442 Stock) or six coaches (450 Stock), longer trains only open the doors in the first five or six coaches depending on the type of unit operating the service.

As of February 2022, the following services call here in both directions:
 Monday - Friday
 peak hours: 2 trains per hour on Poole - London Waterloo service, which some of them join / split at Southampton Central with a fast train for Weymouth
 off-peak: 1 train per hour on Bournemouth - Winchester stopping service
 Saturday
 1 train per hour on Poole - Winchester stopping service
 Sunday
 1 train per hour on Poole - London Waterloo stopping service

References

Railway stations in Hampshire
DfT Category E stations
Former London and South Western Railway stations
Railway stations served by South Western Railway
Railway stations in Great Britain opened in 1888